Stacy's Knights is a 1983 American film directed by Jim Wilson.

The film is also known as Double Down, The Touch (American video title), Winning Streak (British video title).

Plot summary 
Stacy (Andra Millian), a timid woman, is learning how to play blackjack and meets Will (Kevin Costner) who coaches her in card counting. When she is successful at a casino in Reno, Nevada, the corrupt casino management assigns a cheating dealer to stop her and eventually they have Will killed. In retaliation, Stacy recruits a team of players and trains them to win at the game. The team returns to the casino, with Stacy in disguise, to avenge Will's murder by winning a large amount of money.

Cast 
Kevin Costner as Will Bonner
Andra Millian as Stacy Lancaster
Eve Lilith as Jean Dennison
Mike Reynolds as Shecky Poole
Garth Howard as Mr. C.
Ed Semenza as The Kid
Don Hackstaff as Lawyer
Loyd Catlett as Buster
Cheryl Ferris as Marion
Gary Tilles as Rudy
Roge Roush as Rollin
John Brevick as Floor Boss
Robin Landis as Bourbon Drinker
Shashawnee Hall as Recruit
Robert Conder as Recruit
Frederick Hughes as Recruit
Steve Noonan as Make-Up Man
David Brevick as Rejected Recruit
Steve Kopanke as Video Tech #1
Jim Kosub as Video Tech #2
Ray Whittey as Frisker
Roy Reeves as Dealer
Tena Knox as Dealer
Joanne Lisosky as Dealer
Theresa Thompson as Dealer
Mark Conrad as Dealer
Pete Borsz as Dealer
Dennis Pflederer as Security Man
Jay Conder as Pit Boss
John Coinman as Stiff

Soundtrack 
 "Good Things" (Written by John Lawrence, co-writer with J. Lawrence, Ken Hilton)

References

External links 

1983 films
1983 drama films
American drama films
Films about blackjack
1980s English-language films
1980s American films